Zoom were a Eurodance group formed in Denmark. Their top hit was "Words", a cover version of the 1982 song by F.R. David. It reached number 7 in Denmark.

Discography

Studio albums

Singles

References

Danish Eurodance groups
Danish musical groups